The men's lightweight (60 kg/118.8 lbs) Low-Kick division at the W.A.K.O. European Championships 2006 in Skopje was the fourth lightest of the male Low-Kick tournaments and involved eleven fighters.  Each of the matches was three rounds of two minutes each and were fought under Low-Kick kickboxing rules.

As there were too few participants for a tournament of sixteen, five of the men had byes through to the quarter final stage.  Eduard Mammadov from Azerbaijan won gold after having made the final in Agadir the previous year, beating Dzianis Tselitsa from Belarus by unanimous decision.  Defeated semi finalists Russian's Alikhan Chumaev and Grigory Gorokhov both won bronze.

Results

Key

See also
List of WAKO Amateur European Championships
List of WAKO Amateur World Championships
List of male kickboxers

References

External links
 WAKO World Association of Kickboxing Organizations Official Site

W.A.K.O. European Championships 2006 (Skopje)